The Brisbane Valley Highway is a state highway in Queensland, Australia. Its direction follows the approximate course of the Brisbane River. It is part of State Route A17, which is duplexed with the D'Aguilar Highway to Nanango and then becomes the Burnett Highway. State Route 85 is duplexed with the Brisbane Valley Highway from Esk to the D'Aguilar Highway.

Upgrades

Intersection with Warrego Highway
From 2015, the intersection with the Warrego Highway was converted into a grade-separated interchange.

Pedestrian facilities
A project to upgrade pedestrian facilities in Fernvale, at a cost of $1.566 million, was due for completion in early 2022.

Safety improvements
A project to improve safety on a section of the highway, at a cost of $14.4 million, was due for completion in mid-2022.

Pavement rehabilitation
A project to rehabilitate the road surface through Esk township, at a cost of $5.5 million, was due for completion in mid-2022.

List of towns along the Brisbane Valley Highway
 Ipswich
 Fernvale
 Esk
 Toogoolawah

Major intersections

Gallery

See also

 Bridges over the Brisbane River
 Highways in Australia
 List of highways in Queensland
 List of highways numbered 85

References

External links

Highways in Queensland
South East Queensland